Kyrgyzstan competed at the 2012 Summer Olympics in London, United Kingdom from 27 July 2012 to 12 August 2012. This was the nation's fifth appearance at the Olympics in the post-Soviet era.

The National Olympic Committee of the Republic of Kyrgyzstan sent the nation's smallest delegation to the Games. A total of 14 athletes, 11 men and 3 women, competed in 8 sports, including the nation's Olympic debut in sailing. This was also Kyrgyzstan's youngest delegation in Summer Olympic history, with more than half under the age of 25, and many of them were expected to reach their peak in time for the 2016 Summer Olympics in Rio de Janeiro. Judoka Chingiz Mamedov was the nation's flag bearer at the opening ceremony.

For the third time in history, Kyrgyzstan, however, failed to win a single Olympic medal in London.

Athletics

Kyrgyz athletes have so far achieved qualifying standards in the following athletics events (up to a maximum of 3 athletes in each event at the 'A' Standard, and 1 at the 'B' Standard):

Men

Women

Judo

Men

Sailing

Kyrgyzstan has qualified 1 boat for each of the following events

Men

M = Medal race; EL = Eliminated – did not advance into the medal race;

Shooting

Kyrgyzstan has ensured berths in the following events of shooting

Men

Swimming

Kyrgyzstan has gained two "Universality places" from the FINA.

Men

Women

Taekwondo

Kyrgyzstan has qualified in the following events.

Weightlifting

Kyrgyzstan has qualified the following quota places.

Wrestling

Kyrgyzstan has qualified in the following weight categories.

Men's freestyle

Men's Greco-Roman

Women's freestyle

References

Nations at the 2012 Summer Olympics
2012
2012 in Kyrgyzstani sport